Fredrik Gyllenborg  (10 December 1767–18 August 1829) was Prime Minister for Justice from June 25, 1810 to August 18, 1829.

References

1767 births
1829 deaths
Swedish nobility
Prime Ministers of Sweden